Barrio Gris is a 1954 Argentine film directed by Mario Soffici. The film won the Silver Condor Award at the 1955 Argentine Film Critics Association Awards.

Cast
Luis Arata ... Don García
Vicente Ariño ... Don Avelino
María Esther Corán ... Verdulera
Carlos Cotto ... Padre de Zulema
Alberto de Mendoza ... Claudio

External links
 

1954 films
1950s Spanish-language films
Argentine black-and-white films
Films directed by Mario Soffici
Argentine drama films
1954 drama films
1950s Argentine films